Wachirawit Ruangwiwat (also known as Chimon/Chimonac, born 15 January 2000) is a Thai actor. He is known for his main roles as Sun in GMMTV's My Dear Loser: Edge of 17 (2017), Wave in The Gifted (2018), The Gifted: Graduation (2020) and Andrew in Blacklist (2019).

Early life and education 
Wachirawit was born in Bangkok, Thailand. He completed his secondary education at Assumption College, where he became one of its football athletes. He is currently taking up a bachelor's degree in film under the School of Digital Media and Cinematic Arts at Bangkok University.

Career 
Wachirawit started in the entertainment industry with his appearance in the film 13 Beloved (2006). He officially debuted as an actor in 2015 as part of the movie Ghost Ship (2015) and later on got the main role for Sweet Boy (2016). He went on to be part of the television series Senior Secret Love: My Lil Boy 2 (2016), where he played the role of Toy. He has been an artist of GMMTV since 2015.

Filmography

Film

Television

Music videos

References

External links 
 
 
 

2000 births
Living people
Wachirawit Ruangwiwat
Wachirawit Ruangwiwat
Wachirawit Ruangwiwat
Wachirawit Ruangwiwat
Wachirawit Ruangwiwat